Hans Christian Andersen: My Life as a Fairytale is a 2003 semi-biographical television miniseries that fictionalizes the young life of Danish author Hans Christian Andersen. It was directed by Philip Saville and starred Kieran Bew as the title character. Four Hans Christian Andersen fairytales are included as short interludes of the story, and intertwined into the events of the young author's life.

Cast
 Kieran Bew as Hans Christian Andersen
 Emily Hamilton as Jette
 Flora Montgomery as Jenny Lind
 Simon Callow as Charles Dickens
 Edward Atterton as Prince Christian of Denmark
 Mathieu Carrière as Otto Goldschmidt
 Joe Prospero as Francis Dickens
 Charlie Hicks as Edward Dickens
 James Fox as Jonas Collin

Fairytales featured
 The Little Match Girl
 Thumbelina
 The Princess and the Pea
  The Nightingale
 The Tinderbox
 The Little Mermaid
 The Steadfast Tin Soldier
 The Ugly Duckling
 The Snow Queen

References

External links

Flixster.com entry

2000s American television miniseries
Films directed by Philip Saville
Cultural depictions of Hans Christian Andersen
Cultural depictions of Charles Dickens
Cultural depictions of Jenny Lind
Works about writers
Television shows based on works by Hans Christian Andersen
Works based on Thumbelina
Works based on The Princess and the Pea
Television shows based on The Little Mermaid
Works based on The Ugly Duckling
Works based on The Snow Queen
Works based on The Steadfast Tin Soldier
Works based on The Little Match Girl
Works based on The Nightingale (fairy tale)